is a passenger railway station located in the city of Mitaka, Tokyo, Japan, operated by the private railway operator Keio Corporation.

Lines

Service pattern
Only all-stations "Local" services stop at this station. During the daytime, there are eight services per hour in either direction.

Station layout

The station consists of two ground-level side platforms serving two tracks. The station building is built above the tracks.

There are elevators from the concourse to each of the two platforms, and to the north exit of the station. The stairway from the north exit is connected by a pedestrian bridge over the road below, which the rails also cross.

There are toilets accessible from platform one, with a "multi-purpose" toilet as well as men's and women's toilets.

Platforms

History
The station opened on 1 August 1933.

From 22 February 2013, station numbering was introduced on Keio lines, with Mitakadai Station becoming "IN15".

Passenger statistics
In fiscal 2019, the station was used by an average of 22,072 passengers daily.

The passenger figures for previous years are as shown below.

Surrounding area
 Kanda River
 St. Margaret's Junior College

See also
List of railway stations in Japan

References

External links

 Mitakadai Station information (Keio) 

Railway stations in Tokyo
Railway stations in Japan opened in 1933
Keio Inokashira Line
Stations of East Japan Railway Company
Mitaka, Tokyo